Owen Cheung (born 20 July 1987) is a Hong Kong actor contracted to TVB. 

Cheung is best known for his roles as Kuk Yat-ha (Gogo) in Legal Mavericks (2017) and Ko Ban in Al Cappuccino (2020). After winning the 2019 TVB Anniversary Award for Most Improved Male Artiste award, he won the Most Popular Male Character award at the 2020 TVB Anniversary Awards.

Life and career 
As a graduate of the Hong Kong Design Institute, Owen Cheung's introduction to the entertainment industry was through the New Talent Singing Awards in 2006, when he was 19 years old. In 2010, he auditioned for TVB's Artiste Training Class and high school's graduated a year later. 

Cheung made his acting debut in 2012 through the sitcom Come Home Love. He had played minor roles in several television dramas. In 2014, Cheung rose to popularity after appearing on the variety show Walk The Walk, Talk The Talk, in which he impersonated Chilam Cheung in his role as Captain Cool in the drama Triumph in the Skies II.

In 2017, Cheung gained recognition with his role as the detective "Gogo" Kut Yat-ha in the legal drama Legal Mavericks, winning My Favourite TVB Supporting Actor award at the 2017 StarHub TVB Awards. With his performance in the 2019 dramas Justice Bao: The First Year and Finding Her Voice, Cheung won the 2019 TVB Anniversary Award for Most Improved Male Artiste. 

In 2020, Cheung won the Most Popular Male Character award at the 2020 TVB Anniversary Awards with his role in the comedy drama Al Cappuccino.  Together with Vincent Wong and Brian Chu, he also won the Most Popular Onscreen Partnership Award.

Filmography

TV dramas

Film

Music videos
Mag Lam "樹籐" (2012)
Jinny Ng "想起你" (2014)

References

External links
 at Weibo
 at Facebook
 at Instagram

1987 births
Living people
21st-century Hong Kong male actors
Hong Kong people
TVB actors